All Because of Love is a 2017 Taiwanese romance film directed by Lien Yi-chi, starring Kent Tsai, Dara Hanfman, Gingle Wang and Lee Ying-hung. It was released in theaters on August 18, 2017.

Premise
Er-kan, a high school student who is in love with the most beautiful girl in the class, has to endure continuous abuse from the bullies in school. However, when the girl of his dreams becomes the girlfriend of the leader of the bullies, things can only get worse from there.

Cast
 Kent Tsai as Chen Er-kan
 Dara Hanfman as Tseng Hsin-er 	
 Gingle Wang as Hung Man-li

Special appearance
 Hsu Hsiao-shun as Chen Yu-li, Er-kan's grandpa
 Lee Ying-hung as Andy
 Monster as Chen Chu, Er-kan's father
 Cheryl Yang as Tan-meng, Er-kan's mother

Cameo appearance

 Peng Chia-chia as Chen Yu-li's friend
 Miao Ke-li as Man-li's mother
 Bamboo Chen as Man-li's father
 Kuo Shu-yao as Hsu Kan-tien, Er-kan's grandma (young)
 Emerson Tsai as Chen Yu-li (young)
 Tsai Tsan-te as Tseng Mei-jen, Hsin-er's mother
 Fabio Grangeon as Matt, Hsin-er's father
 Alien Huang as Hung Ti-so, Man-li's brother
 Huang Fei as Hsu Kan-tien (middle-aged)
 Bebe Chang as Hsiao-yu 
 Leo Wang as Cupid
 Lyn Wang as Michiko

Soundtrack

Awards and nominations

References

External links
 
 
 

2017 films
Taiwanese romantic comedy-drama films
Taiwanese teen films
2017 romantic comedy-drama films
2010s teen comedy-drama films
Films directed by Lien Yi-chi
2017 comedy films
2017 drama films
2010s Mandarin-language films